Leandro Ramos Mendoza (March 17, 1946 – October 7, 2013) was a Filipino politician who served as Executive Secretary of the Philippines. He previously served as Chief of the Philippine National Police and DOTC Secretary.

Early life
Mendoza was born in San Juan, Batangas. He finished his Bachelor of Science degree at the Philippine Military Academy; his Master of Arts in Public Management at the University of the Philippines - Visayas, Cebu City; and General Staff Course at the AFPCGSC, Fort Bonifacio.

Career History
Secretary Mendoza was a professional police officer and a noted management practitioner. His various professional experiences from his stint as a second lieutenant in the regular force of the Philippine Constabulary up until his appointment as Executive Director of the Philippines Center on Transnational Crime have prepared him to assume the role of the top law enforcer in the country. He was promoted to the rank of Police Director General of the Philippine National Police on March 16, 2001, and was appointed as PNP Chief. On July 3, 2002, President Gloria Macapagal Arroyo appointed  Leandro R. Mendoza as the Secretary of the Department of Transportation and Communications (DOTC).

FAA downgrade
On January 17, 2008, the US Federal Aviation Administration (FAA) downgraded the Philippines' rating to Category 2 from Category 1, since its Air Transportation Office (Philippines) (ATO) did not follow international safety standards. Consequently, Philippine Airlines (PAL) president Jaime Bautista stated that its 2008 growth targets would be lowered. Just out of 8 years receivership last year, the FAA decision prevents PAL from increasing US flights from 33 per week, inter alia. Meanwhile, President Gloria Macapagal Arroyo dismissed acting Air Transportation Office chief Danilo Dimagiba after the said FAA rating downgrade on the Philippine aviation industry (after it "failed to comply with the aviation standards set by the International Civil Aviation Organization (ICAO): outdated aviation regulations, poor training programs for safety inspectors and sub-standard licensing for air frame and engine inspectors"). She designated DOTC [Department of Transportation and Communications] Secretary Leandro Mendoza as concurrent Officer in Charge of ATO." Also, the Embassy of the United States in Manila warned US citizens in the Philippines "to refrain from using Philippine-based carriers due to "serious concerns" about the ATO's alleged mishandling of the aviation industry." Dimagiba blamed lack of funds for the FAA downgrade, alleging that ATO nees P 1 billion ($ 1= P40).

Personal life
Mendoza was married to former Soledad Latorre of Lambunao, Iloilo: they have three sons and three daughters namely Maria Leah & Raymond, Michael & Eileen, former Batangas 4th District Representative Mark Llandro & Rochelle, Maria Leilani & Rey, Matthew and Maria Leanne. His brothers and sisters: Dorie & Romy (†), Lina & Carlos (†), Aida & Ricky, and Efren & Joy. His grandchildren: Marcus, Marth, Joshua, Migs, Macoy, Mico, Chin-Chin, Kiko, Moi-Moi, Mimai and King.

Death
Mendoza died of a heart attack on October 7, 2013. He was 67. His son, Batangas Representative Mark Llandro Mendoza, himself confirmed the news, former Department of Transportation and Communication (DOTC) Undersecretary Thompson Lantion told Inquirer.net over the phone. Lantion said the family would bring the body to Heritage Memorial Park in Taguig.

DZIQ Radyo Inquirer also reported that Mendoza's death was announced at the Land Transportation Office's (LTO) flag raising ceremony by Engineer Joel Donato, chief of the LTO Motor Vehicle Inspection Section.

References

1946 births
2013 deaths
People from Batangas
Filipino police chiefs
Philippine Constabulary personnel
Filipino Roman Catholics
Philippine Military Academy alumni
Secretaries of Transportation of the Philippines
Executive Secretaries of the Philippines
Burials at The Heritage Park
Arroyo administration cabinet members
University of the Philippines Visayas alumni